Kristal Awuah (born 7 August 1999) is a British sprinter.

From Tooting Bec, London and a member of the Herne Hill Harriers, Awuah gained her first international experience at the 2018 IAAF World U20 Championships in Tampere, where she won the bronze medal in 11.37 seconds for the 100 metres, as well as gaining a medal with the British 4 x 100 metres relay team. She finished fourth in the 60 metres at the 2019 European Athletics Indoor Championships in Glasgow with a personal best time of 7.15 seconds. In July 2019 she finished sixth in the 200 metres at the 2019 European Athletics U23 Championships in Gävle in 23.66 seconds.

Awuah claimed two national age group gold medals at the England Athletics U20 and U23 championships in Bedford in June 2021. On 26 June 2021 at the British Championship she finished fourth in the 100m in a seasons best time of 11.23 seconds. The next day she also reached the final of the women's 200m, finishing 8th.

She is of Ghanaian descent.

References

1999 births
Living people
British female sprinters
Black British sportswomen
Athletes from London
English people of Ghanaian descent
21st-century British women